
Gmina Czerniejewo is an urban-rural gmina (administrative district) in Gniezno County, Greater Poland Voivodeship, in west-central Poland.

Villages
Apart from the town of Czerniejewo, Gmina Czerniejewo contains the villages and settlements of Czeluścin, Gębarzewko, Gębarzewo, Golimowo, Goraniec, Goranin, Graby, Kąpiel, Kosmowo, Kosowo, Nidom, Pakszyn, Pakszynek, Pawłowo, Rakowo, Szczytniki Czerniejewskie and Żydowo.

Neighbouring gminas
Gmina Czerniejewo is bordered by the town of Gniezno and by the gminas of Gniezno, Łubowo, Nekla, Niechanowo, Pobiedziska and Września.

References
Polish official population figures 2006

Czerniejewo
Gniezno County